Miguel Vasconcelos (10 January 1910 – 2 November 1993) was a Mexican middle-distance runner. He competed in the men's 800 metres at the 1932 Summer Olympics.

References

External links
 

1910 births
1993 deaths
Athletes (track and field) at the 1932 Summer Olympics
Mexican male middle-distance runners
Olympic athletes of Mexico
Athletes from Mexico City
Central American and Caribbean Games medalists in athletics